The Classical Variation of the Scotch Game is a chess opening that begins with the moves:

1. e4 e5
2. Nf3 Nc6
3. d4 exd4
4. Nxd4 Bc5

White has several fifth move options, including 5.Be3, 5.Nxc6, 5.Nb3 and 5.Nf5.

5.Be3
Most common is 5.Be3. Black then typically replies with 5...Qf6, although 5...Bb6 and, less frequently, 5...Nxd4 or 5...Bxd4 are also played. Black must avoid 5...Nf6?? (as 6. Nxc6 followed by 7.Bxc5 wins the bishop), or 5...d6? (as 6.Nxc6 bxc6 7.Bxc5 dxc5 leaves Black with tripled pawns on the c-file). 

After 5...Qf6, play typically continues with 6.c3 Nge7. Here White again has options, the most popular being 7.Bc4 and 7.g3. Black may reply to 7.Bc4 with 7...Ne5 (8.Be2 Qg6 9.0-0 d6 [9...Qxe4?! 10.b4! is a risky venture for Black] 10.f3 0-0 and then 11.Nd2 or 11.Kh1), 7...0-0 (8.0-0 Bb6 and then 9.Na3 or 9.Nc2, among others), or 7...b6 (8.0-0 Bb7 and then 9.Nb5, 9.f4, or 9.Nb3). It was claimed in an analysis by Alexey Sokolsky in the 1940s that 7...Ne5 followed by 8...Qg6 led to equality, and for this reason 7.Bc4 fell out of popularity until it was revived in the 1990s by Garry Kasparov, among others. Black usually replies to 7.g3 with 7...d5, followed by 8.Bg2 dxe4 9.Nd2 Bxd4 10.cxd4 0-0 11.Nxe4 Qg6 12.0-0.

5.Nxc6
Also popular is 5.Nxc6. After 5...Qf6 (the Intermezzo Variation), White may play 6.Qd2 (6...dxc6 7.Nc3, where Black has several 7th move options) or offer a queen exchange with 6.Qf3. This move is less common at the top level, as it is unclear that White has any advantage after 5...Qf6.

5.Nb3 and 5.Nf5
Also seen are the knight moves 5.Nb3 (the Potter Variation, revived in the 2000s with success by Vassily Ivanchuk and Magnus Carlsen) and 5.Nf5. After 5.Nb3 Bb6, White can choose 6.Nc3 (6...Qf6 7.Qe2 Nge7 8.Be3 0-0 9.0-0-0 d6) or 6.a4 (6...a6 7.Nc3).

References 

Chess openings